Dalaca chiliensis is a species of moth of the family Hepialidae. It is known from Chile, from which its species epithet is derived.

References

External links
Hepialidae genera

Moths described in 1950
Hepialidae
Moths of South America
Endemic fauna of Chile